The Ismailia Stadium is located in Ismailia, Egypt, and has a total capacity of 18,525 after the remodelation in 2009, then it was upgraded to 30,000 seats after the remodelation in 2019 for the 2019 Africa Cup of Nations, It is used by Ismaily SC, and was one of six stadiums used in the 2006 African Cup of Nations and 2019 Africa Cup of Nations, held in Egypt.

2019 Africa Cup of Nations
The stadium is one of the venues for the 2019 Africa Cup of Nations.

The following games were played at the stadium during the 2019 Africa Cup of Nations:

References

Football venues in Egypt
Ismaily SC
2019 Africa Cup of Nations stadiums